Lafrançaise (Languedocien: La Francesa) is a commune in the Tarn-et-Garonne department in the Occitanie region in southern France.

See also
Communes of the Tarn-et-Garonne department
André Abbal

References

Communes of Tarn-et-Garonne